Walter Andrews may refer to:

 Walter Boyd Andrews (1792–1847), early settler and, briefly, politician of Western Australia
 Walter G. Andrews (1889–1949), U.S. Representative from New York
 Walter Andrews (cricketer) (1865–1908), English cricketer
 Walter Andrews (cyclist) (1881–1954), Canadian Olympic cyclist
 Walter Simon Andrews (1847–1899), British policeman
 Walter Andrews (bishop) (1852–1932), Anglican bishop in Japan